Francois Cornelius du Toit (born 16 March 1990) is a South African professional rugby union player, currently playing with the . His regular position is fly-half, but he can play in a variety of backline positions, such as inside centre, wing or fullback.

Career

Youth / UFS Shimlas / Free State (2007–13)

Du Toit attended Grey College in Bloemfontein, where he earned call-ups to represent the Free State at youth tournaments. He represented them at the 2007 Under-18 Academy Week held in Pietersburg and also at the Under-18 Craven Week – the premier high school rugby union tournament in South Africa – held in Pretoria in 2008. He was then included in a South African Under-18 Elite Squad and then earned a selection to be the starting fly-half for the South African Schools team that played against a South African Schools Academy side in August 2008. He was also included in the  squad that competed at the 2008 Under-19 Provincial Championship.

In 2009, he was included in the  side that participated in the 2009 Varsity Cup, although he failed to make an appearance. Du Toit was also named in Free State's squad for the 2011 Vodacom Cup, but – despite being named on the bench for their match against the  – failed to make any appearances. In the latter half of the year, he represented the  side in the 2010 Under-21 Provincial Championship. He appeared in all thirteen of their matches in the competition and was the joint-top scorer for the Shimlas along with George Whitehead with 125 points. He nearly matched that tally in their semi-final match against , scoring 29 points in a 49–49 draw. However, it was not enough to put the Free State U21s in the final, with Western Province progressing by virtue of scoring more tries in the match.

Just five minutes after coming on, Du Toit scored his first senior try, although he missed the resultant conversion and another one later in the match as his side suffered a 19–37 defeat. He made eight appearances for the Free State Under-21s in the 2011 Under-21 Provincial Championship, scoring 26 points in a disappointing season as the side failed to reach the semi-finals, finishing in fifth place on the log.

Du Toit continued to represent UFS Shimlas in the Varsity Cup in 2012 and 2013, making five appearances in each of those seasons.

Griffons (2013–)

In 2013, Du Toit joined Welkom-based side  during the 2013 Currie Cup First Division season. Despite contributing 20 points (kicking 10 conversions), he could not help the Griffons qualify for the semi-finals, finishing in sixth spot on the log.

He made five appearances for them in the 2014 Vodacom Cup, scoring 21 points. Due to a change in the format of the Currie Cup for 2014, the Griffons then has to participate in the 2014 Currie Cup qualification series. The Griffons finished in third place, failing to qualify for the 2014 Currie Cup Premier Division, instead playing in the 2014 Currie Cup First Division. Du Toit made his comeback in this competition and made six appearances, scoring 29 points. The Griffons finished in second spot on the log to qualify for the semi-finals.

Du Toit made three appearances in the 2015 Vodacom Cup as the Griffons finished sixth in the Northern Section to miss out on a semi-final spot. A further three appearances followed in the 2015 Currie Cup qualification series, but the Griffons finished fifth, once again failing to secure a spot in the Premier Division. Du Toit made five starts in the 2015 Currie Cup First Division as the Griffons attempted to retain the title they won in 2014. Du Toit scored 31 points, the fifth-highest in the competition, during his five appearances.

References

South African rugby union players
Living people
1990 births
People from Vryburg
Rugby union fly-halves
Rugby union centres
Rugby union wings
Rugby union fullbacks
Free State Cheetahs players
Griffons (rugby union) players
Rugby union players from North West (South African province)